Rock Springs is a collection of short stories by author Richard Ford, published in 1987 and largely dealing with dysfunctional mothers and fathers and their effects on young male narrators.

As with his earlier novels A Piece of My Heart (1976) and The Ultimate Good Luck (1981), Ford's stories are notable for their lack of sentimentality and undercurrent of menace, characteristics that led Granta editor Bill Buford to include Ford in his 'Dirty realism' categorization alongside fellow short-story writer Raymond Carver. Carver selected Ford's short story "Communist" for inclusion in The Best American Short Stories 1986.

Contents
The ten stories of Rock Springs appear in this sequence:
"Rock Springs"
"Great Falls"
"Sweet Hearts"
"Children"
"Going to the Dogs"
"Empire"
"Winterkill"
"Optimists"
"Fireworks"
"Communist"

References

1987 short story collections
American short story collections